Cysteine-rich secretory protein 3 is a cysteine-rich secretory protein that in humans is encoded by the CRISP3 gene.

References

Further reading

External links